The Breda 5C was an Italian medium machine gun, which was adopted by the Royal Italian Army and used in the Second Italo-Ethiopian War and in World War II.

History 
Breda 5C, together with Fiat Mod. 26, was designed by the Italian Society Ernesto Breda Costruzioni Meccaniche to replace the machine gun SIA Mod. 1918. Despite the unsatisfactory results of both arms during the tests, however, they were adopted by the Royal Italian Army  to address the critical shortage of automatic weapons. Assigned to the troops of Tripoli, a few dozen unit were used by meharists during World War II. It also armed the armored cars Fiat 611.

Description 
The weapon had many features that will then be taken in the machine gun Breda Mod. 30. The barrel was quick change and, through a handle in asbestos, was pulled away, with a half rotation, from the barrel holder sleeve. The functioning was blowback operation of the barrel with locking of the bolt through wing and with oil lubrication of bullets. Shooting with bolt closed. The rear of the receiver ended with two knobs with the firing button and a false wooden stock. The feeding was through a magazine on the right side, front-hinged. For charging, it was front rotated, you could insert the plate with 20 rounds, then this was withdrawn leaving the rounds in the magazine, which was then closed by rotating to the rear. The iron sights was elevated through a cursor. To be fired the weapon necessitated for a 2,860 kg tripod, which doubled as a saddle for the transport of the weapon.

Other versions

Breda 5G 
This version is essentially the same weapon, with the same operation, but adapted to light machine gun size. The knobs are replaced by a stock with a lower removable tip and a wooden grips and a trigger. The tripod is eliminated and replaced by a bipod attached to the barrel holder sleeve.

Bibliography 
 Mitragliatrice Breda Mod 5C e 5G, Società Ernesto Breda Costruzioni Meccaniche, 1930.
 Nicola Pignato, Armi della fanteria italiana nella seconda guerra mondiale, Ermanno Albertelli Editore, 1979.

Note

See also 
 Breda Mod. 30
 SIA Mod. 1918

Light machine guns
World War II infantry weapons of Italy
World War II machine guns
Machine guns of Italy
Breda weapons